The Terai Madhesh Sadbhavana Party Nepal was a political party in Nepal. It was led by Mahendra Raya Yadav. It was formed through the merger of Terai Madhesh Loktantrik Party Nepal, a splinter group of Terai Madhesh Loktantrik Party and Rastriya Sadbhavana Party, a splinter group of Sadbhavana Party.

The Terai Madhes Sadbhavana Party won 3 seats in the 2013 Nepalese Constituent Assembly election.

On 21 April 2017 the party merged with Tarai Madhes Loktantrik Party, Nepal Sadbhawana Party, Sadbhavana Party, Madhesi Janaadhikar Forum (Republican) and Rastriya Madhesh Samajwadi Party to form Rastriya Janata Party Nepal.

Electoral performance

References

Political parties in Nepal
Political parties with year of establishment missing
2013 establishments in Nepal
2017 disestablishments in Nepal